Marko Lomić (Serbian Cyrillic: Марко Ломић; born 13 September 1983) is a Serbian former professional footballer who played as a left-back.

Club career
Lomić started out at his hometown club Borac Čačak, before transferring to Železnik in the summer of 2002. He spent the following three seasons with the Lavovi, winning the Serbia and Montenegro Cup in 2005.

On 23 June 2005, Lomić signed a four-year contract with Partizan. He was given the number 13 shirt, previously worn by South Korean youth international Kim Chi-woo. Over the next two seasons, Lomić made 50 league appearances and scored three goals for the club. In June 2007, Lomić was transferred to TuS Koblenz, penning a three-year deal.

On 31 August 2009, Lomić rejoined Partizan from TuS Koblenz after the two clubs agreed a transfer. He signed a two-year contract and was given the number 11 shirt. In his comeback season, Lomić made 25 league appearances and scored three goals, thus helping his team win the title, as well as making the competition's best eleven.

On 5 July 2010, Lomić moved to Dynamo Moscow, penning a three-year deal. He made a total of 106 official appearances and scored one goal for the club in the following four seasons. In July 2014, Lomić signed a two-year contract with Mordovia Saransk. He scored a brace in a 2–1 home league win over Krasnodar on 2 November 2014.

International career
Lomić was selected by Vladimir Petrović in the 18-man squad to represent Serbia and Montenegro at the 2004 Summer Olympics. He appeared in all three group games; a 0–6 loss to Argentina, a 1–5 loss to Australia, and a 2–3 loss to Tunisia, as the team finished bottom of the table.

Subsequently, Lomić was a regular member of the national under-21 team during the UEFA Under-21 Championship 2006 qualifiers. He also played the full 90 minutes in all four of Serbia and Montenegro's matches in the final tournament, where they were eliminated in the semi-final by Ukraine after penalties.

In August 2006, Lomić was called up to the Serbia national team by manager Javier Clemente for their first match as an independent country against the Czech Republic, but an injury ruled him out of the game. He however appeared in an unofficial friendly against the Basque Country on 27 December 2006.

Eventually, Lomić made his debut for Serbia in a friendly match against Japan on 7 April 2010 in Osaka, playing the full 90 minutes. Although the team was composed of players from country's top domestic league, Serbia won 3–0. He also played in a shocking 1–3 loss at home to Estonia in a UEFA Euro 2012 qualifier on 8 October 2010.

Statistics

Club

International

Honours

Club
Železnik
 Serbia and Montenegro Cup: 2004–05
Partizan
 Serbian SuperLiga: 2009–10

Individual
 Serbian SuperLiga Team of the Season: 2009–10

Notes

References

External links

 
 
 
 
 

2. Bundesliga players
Association football defenders
Expatriate footballers in Germany
Expatriate footballers in Russia
FC Dynamo Moscow players
FC Mordovia Saransk players
First League of Serbia and Montenegro players
FK Borac Čačak players
FK Partizan players
FK Železnik players
Footballers at the 2004 Summer Olympics
Olympic footballers of Serbia and Montenegro
Russian Premier League players
Serbia and Montenegro under-21 international footballers
Serbia and Montenegro footballers
Serbia international footballers
Serbian expatriate footballers
Serbian expatriate sportspeople in Germany
Serbian expatriate sportspeople in Russia
Serbian footballers
Serbian SuperLiga players
Sportspeople from Čačak
TuS Koblenz players
1983 births
Living people